"Secret Rendezvous" is the fourth single from American singer Karyn White's 1988 self-titled debut studio album. The song was written by Kenneth "Babyface" Edmonds, Antonio "L.A." Reid and Daryl Simmons, and produced by Reid and Babyface, who were at the peak of their success at the time as a songwriting and production team.

In the United States, it went to number one on the Billboard dance chart. On other Billboard charts, "Secret Rendezvous" went to number four on the R&B chart and number six on the pop chart. It was White's biggest hit at that time. Overseas, it peaked at number 22 on the UK Singles Chart.

Track listing and formats
12-inch vinyl single, promo (USA)
 Secret Rendezvous (12" House Version) – 7:25
 Secret Rendezvous (Secret Drive-Time Radio Edit) – 4:02
 Secret Rendezvous (12" Dance Mix) – 7:15

12-inch vinyl single (USA, UK, Germany)
 Secret Rendezvous (Zanzibar Mix) – 6:00
 Secret Rendezvous (12" White House Remix) – 7:24
 Secret Rendezvous (Bacepella) – 6:06

12-inch vinyl single (UK)
 Secret Rendezvous (After Hour Mix)
 Secret Rendezvous (Extended Mix)
 Secret Rendezvous (Dub-Dez-Vous Mix)

12-inch vinyl single (USA)
 Secret Rendezvous (Extended Remix) – 6:58
 Secret Rendezvous (12" White House Remix) – 7:18
 Secret Rendezvous (Bacepella) – 6:01
 Secret Rendezvous (After Hours Mix) – 7:25
 Secret Rendezvous (12" Dance Mix) – 7:20
 Tell Me Tomorrow (LP Version) – 4:54

CD maxi-single, promo (USA)
 Secret Rendezvous (Single Edit) – 3:58
 Secret Rendezvous (Secret Drive Time Radio Edit) – 4:02
 Secret Rendezvous (White House Radio Edit Version) – 5:30
 Secret Rendezvous (After Hours Mix) – 7:25
 Secret Rendezvous (After Hours Edit) – 4:00

Mini CD (Germany)
 Secret Rendezvous (7" Version) – 4:06
 Secret Rendezvous (After Hour Mix) – 7:27
 Secret Rendezvous (Extended Mix) – 6:54

Mini CD (Germany)
 Secret Rendezvous (Edit) – 4:05
 Secret Rendezvous (Zanzibar Mix) – 6:03
 Secret Rendezvous (12" White House Remix) – 7:25

Charts

Weekly charts

Year-end charts

References

1988 songs
1989 singles
Karyn White songs
New jack swing songs
Song recordings produced by Babyface (musician)
Songs written by Babyface (musician)
Songs written by Daryl Simmons
Songs written by L.A. Reid